Hendrik van den Eynde (Latin: Henricus Affinus) (fl. 1517) was a Lier physician and a friend of Erasmus of Rotterdam. He was chief physician of Antwerp, and was involved with Erasmus in "dogged negotiations" about the exchange of silver cups for Erasmus' dedication in one of his books.

Hendrik van den Eynde from Lier was chief physician of Antwerp in 1517.

He put it aside until 1518, when Van den Eynde promised him two silver goblets. Erasmus then decided to publish the declamation, titling it Encomium artis medicae and dedicating it to Van den Eynde. 

Erasmus wrote a letter to Van den Eynde in Louvain, dated 6 January 1518. Erasmus also wanted to dedicate a translation of the second book of grammar of Theodorus Gaza to him.

He is also referred to in Erasmus' letter to Pieter Gillis.

References

15th-century births
Year of birth unknown
Year of death unknown
People from Lier, Belgium
Physicians of the Habsburg Netherlands